The Institute of Information Theory and Automation (UTIA) is a public research institution in Prague administered by the Czech Academy of Sciences. It was established in 1959, and conducts research in, and offers undergraduate, graduate, and postgraduate degrees, in the fields of computer science, signal and image processing, pattern recognition, system science, and control theory. 

The institute publishes a journal, Kybernetika.

References

External links

Kybernetika

Research institutes in the Czech Republic
Science and technology in the Czech Republic
1959 establishments in Czechoslovakia
Czech Academy of Sciences
Science and technology in Czechoslovakia
Research institutes established in 1959